Rowan College at Burlington County (RCBC) is a public community college in Burlington County, New Jersey. Main facilities are located in Mount Laurel with other campuses in Mount Holly, Willingboro and Joint Base.

History 

Founded as Burlington County College in 1966, the college opened to 1,051 students in 1969 at Lenape High School. The Pemberton Campus opened a few years later in 1971. In 1972, the college received accreditation by the Commission on Higher Education, Middle States Association of Colleges and Schools.

Throughout the next several years, the college underwent a series of changes, including increased enrollment, the opening of new campuses, the addition of more degree programs and several leadership changes (see below).

In 2015, Burlington County College was renamed to Rowan College at Burlington County, in recognition of its historic partnership with Rowan University.

In 2016, RCBC became the first community college in New Jersey authorized to offer junior-year courses in its “3+1” option to Rowan University.

Leadership

Locations

Mount Laurel Campus 
RCBC's main campus is located off of Route 38 and in close proximity to I-295. This location in the Hartford section of Mount Laurel, opened in 1995, offers a modern campus experience that rivals those found at four-year universities. It houses the Student Success Center and campus quad to cater to students working toward advanced degrees. A Health Sciences Center is also located off of Briggs Road.

Mount Holly Campus  
Located at High Street and Mill Street, nestled among excellent restaurants, quaint shops and other businesses, this campus is home to RCBC's culinary arts program. This location also includes a student art gallery and a student-run restaurant, Vaulted Cuisine. All of RCBC's art programs are located in Mount Holly.

Willingboro Campus  
RCBC has held a full-time presence in Willingboro since 1974, offering a more accessible location for residents of towns along the Route 130 corridor. This campus features classrooms, computer labs, a student lounge, college offices and student services.
This campus was closed in 2022.

McGuire AFB/Joint Base Campus 
This campus serves the needs of adult learners who are seeking to achieve a promotion in their current career or credentials they need to embark on a new career. Located in the northern part of Burlington County, RCBC's McGuire AFB/Joint Base Campus is an easy drive from Pemberton, Browns Mills, Lakehurst, New Egypt, Hamilton and Jackson Townships, Wrightstown and Cookstown.

Notable alumni
 Zach Braddock, former professional baseball player
 Mario Cerrito, film director and producer
 Ant Clemons, singer
 Denver Riggleman (born 1970), businessman and former politician who served one term as the United States representative for Virginia's 5th congressional district.

See also 

New Jersey County Colleges

References

External links

 - Pemberton campus
 - Mt. Laurel campus

Garden State Athletic Conference
Universities and colleges in Burlington County, New Jersey
New Jersey County Colleges
Educational institutions established in 1966
Mount Laurel, New Jersey
Pemberton Township, New Jersey
1966 establishments in New Jersey
NJCAA athletics